The North Goonyella Coal Mine is a coal mine located in the Bowen Basin at Moranbah in Central Queensland, Australia. The mine has coal reserves amounting to 175 million tonnes of coking coal, one of the largest coal reserves in Australia and the world. The mine has an annual production capacity of 2 million tonnes of coal. 2.6 million tonnes of coal were produced in 2012.

North Goonyella was acquired by Peabody Energy in 2004.  The site consists of an open-cut mine known as Eaglefield and an underground mine called North Goonyella.  The two operations share the same Coal handling and preparation plant.  Water used by the mine is sourced from Burton Gorge Dam.

The mine is serviced by the Goonyella railway line and from December 2011 the GAP line.

See also

Coal mining in Australia
List of mines in Australia

References 

Coal mines in Queensland
Underground mines in Australia
1994 establishments in Australia
Mines in Central Queensland
Peabody Energy